Albert Brudzewski, also Albert Blar (of Brudzewo), Albert of Brudzewo or Wojciech Brudzewski (in Latin, Albertus de Brudzewo; c.1445–c.1497) was a Polish astronomer, mathematician,  philosopher and diplomat.

Life
Albert (in Polish, Wojciech), who would sign himself "de Brudzewo" ("of Brudzewo"), was born about 1445, in Brudzewo, near Kalisz. Scant information exists about his early life.  It is only known that as a 23-year-old he matriculated at the Kraków Academy (now Jagiellonian University), where he remained through nearly all his life, teaching there for two decades.  He served as the academy's dean, as procurator (administrator of its property), and as head of the Bursa Hungarorum ("Hungarians' Dormitory").

Albert is remembered as a remarkable teacher.  At the Kraków Academy he impressed students by his extraordinary knowledge of literature, and taught mathematics and astronomy.  When in 1490 he became a bachelor of theology, he also lectured on Aristotle's philosophy.  These lectures were attended by Nicolaus Copernicus, who enrolled at the academy in 1491.  A major accomplishment of Albert's was his modernization of the teaching of astronomy by introducing the most up-to-date  texts.

Albert was well versed in Georg von Peuerbach's Theory of the Planets and Regiomontanus' Astronomical Tables.  He was skeptical of the geocentric system.  He was the first to state that the Moon moves in an ellipse and always shows its same side to the Earth.

He drew up tables for calculating the positions of heavenly bodies.  In 1482 he wrote a Commentariolum super Theoricas novas planetarum Georgii Purbachii [...] per Albertum de Brudzewo — a commentary on Georg von Peuerbach's text, Theoricae novae planetarum – New Theories of the Planets — published in Milan, Mediolani, in 1495, by his pupil, Jan Otto de Kraceusae with this title Commentaria utilissima in theoricis planetarum.

Besides Copernicus, Albert's students included the mathematician Bernard Wapowski and the German poet and Renaissance humanist, Conrad Celtis, who in Kraków established the first Central European literary society, Sodalitas Litterana Vistulana.

In 1495, at the behest of Cardinal Fryderyk Jagiellończyk (Frederick Jagiellon), Brudzewski moved to Vilnius as secretary to Grand Duke of Lithuania Aleksander Jagiellon, who would later become King Alexander of Poland.  He served the Grand Duke as a diplomat; one of his most important missions involved negotiations with Muscovy's Tsar Ivan the Terrible.  It was in Vilnius that Albert wrote his treatise, Conciliator, the original of which has not yet been found.

Albert of Brudzewo died in Vilnius.  The exact date of his death is not known; some sources state that he died at the age of fifty.

Albert Brudzewski and Averroes 
Albert of Brudzewo or Albert Brudzewski was seen as influential and persuasive astronomer, a fictionalist, and an opponent of Averroes. Averroes disagreed with the majority of the astronomer Ptolemy's work. He believed that Ptolemy's devices and principles disobeyed the fundamental principles and basic consequences of Aristotle's physics. Averroes worked to replace the Ptolemaic astronomical system with a novel system that was similar to a system created by Eudoxus. Albert Brudzewski disagreed and criticized Averroes immediately. The major dispute was the figuring out the number of celestial orbs or spheres that lay in the heavens. Averroes refused to believe that there was a ninth sphere in the heavens. He believed that the creation of all celestial beings had to arise from the stars, but the ninth sphere did not possess any stars, so this could not be true. Albert Brudzewski argued with this and said that the heavens possessed more than ten spheres. He believed that the Sun itself had three spheres and the planets had their own as well.

To make sense and clarify to his followers, Brudzewski said that the terms ‘orb’ or ‘sphere’ had three meanings of interpretation. The first meaning could be the whole entire heavens was designated into a single object which was the orb or sphere. This object was not separate from the whole heavens yet it could exist by itself. The second meaning he paralleled it to the sphere or orb from George Peurbach's Theoricae novae planetarum although it was unconventional, it still existed in the heavens. The third meaning or clarification of orb was an orb that was aligned with the Earth. The third meaning was actually a collection of orbs that was crucial to the motion of a planet.

Albert Brudzewski further disputes Averroes by depending on the assumptions of Aristotle. He said that Aristotle demonstrated and verified five claims about the heavens that could disprove Averroes. The first claim was that the heavens was a simple being. The second claim was that because the heavens was a simple being, the motion of the being also had to be simple and uncomplicated. There could only be one motion and it had to follow the laws of nature. The third claim was that any motion that did not follow the laws of nature had to have an addition motion that did follow the laws of nature. The fourth claim was that a single sphere or orb could not be moved by several motions because it was a simple body. The fifth claim was that any superior or greater orb could have an impact on lesser orbs and spheres but the lesser orbs and spheres could not have any leverage on the superior's ones.

To finally disprove Averroes, Albert Brudzewski mentions the three recognizable motions of the sphere of fixed stars. The first motion was that the sphere possessed a daily rotation that occurred from the East to the West. The second motion was movement of the sphere in the opposition direction from West to East. The third motion was a cyclical motion that Brudzewski named trepidation. Brudzewski gave these three motions to the last three spheres respectively. With the assumptions of Aristotle as well as the motions of the sphere of the fixed stars, Brudzewski is able to prove that Averroes is wrong about the number of celestial spheres in the heavens.

Albert Brudzewski's Views on the Heavens and Planetary Motion 
Albert Brudzewski was known as a fictionalist. He did not think that the motions of the heavens were understood by any human. Richard of Wallingford, an astronomer in the 1300s, had an opposing view for the spheres of the planets. He claimed that no mortal knows whether eccentrics truly exist in the spheres of the planets, but spirits could give humans revelations about the true planetary motion of the heavens through mathematicians. This claim limits the astronomical knowledge of mortals and suggests that spirits do not have the same limitations. Brudzewski acknowledges the existence of these viewpoints but criticized their validity. To astronomers, spirits had an accurate knowledge of the number of celestial orbs. Although, he did not want to discredit the ability of mortals to make claims based on astronomical observations. Albert Brudzewski made the claim for the fundamental principle of astrology that the heavens exert causal influences on the earth.

The paths of planets were thought to be moved by orbs instead of circles. This was a claim by Brudzeski about causal relationships between the planets and their motion. With this view, he disagreed with Averroes about the number of orbs, the concept of epicycles and eccentric circles, and on theoretical orbs. Brudzewski was seen as a source for some of Copernicus's work on orbs, specifically with the Tusi Couple.

Brudzewski's views on Tusi's Couple 
Tusi's couple was known as an epicycle arrangement that creates straight line motion of the planets, created by Copernicus. Some think that Brudzewski is the source for Copernicus's model of the Tusi couple. Albert does account for the moon and its double epicycles where he mentions a spot on the moon. The spot on the moon is the problem of explaining the appearance of the face of the moon when always viewing the Earth. These views were not aligned with the Tusi couple. Although, it is speculated that Copernicus could have encountered such a model, where the primary epicycle carries the center of a second epicycle. This is not the Tusi couple, but it could be slightly changed to match its model. The spot on the moon that is always viewed from the Earth would not appear if there was no epicyclical motion of the moon. The motion of the moon was termed as “prosneusis motion” which was part of the lunar theory. This motion means motion of inclination and turning, which corresponds to the single epicycle in Ptolemy's theory of the moon, and the two epicycles in Brudzewski's model.

Brudzewski was aware of the possibility of linear motions from circular motions based on his model of Mercury's motion. This could be an alternative way that Copernicus generated his idea of linear motion for the Tusi couple. Although it seems that Copernicus used Albert's ideas, he highly relied on Islamic sources for the Tusi couple. Copernicus's parameters for the moon are exactly the same as those of Ibn ash-Shātir. It is unclear where Copernicus truly got his ideas.

See also
Nicolaus Copernicus
List of Poles

Notes

References
 "Brudzewski, Wojciech, [or] Wojciech z Brudzewa," Encyklopedia Powszechna PWN (PWN Universal Encyclopedia), Warsaw, Państwowe Wydawnictwo Naukowe, 1973, vol. 1, p. 353.
 M. Iłowiecki, Dzieje nauki polskiej (History of Polish Science), Warsaw, 1981.
 Zbigniew Lenartowicz, Kaliszanie w Warszawie (Kaliszians in Warsaw), no. 32/33, 2002.
 Józef Retinger, Polacy w cywilizacjach świata (Poles in the World's Civilizations), Warsaw, 1937.
 Tadeusz Rójek, Sławni i nieznani (The Famous and the Unknown).
 Michela Malpangotto, La critique de l'univers de Peurbach développée par Albert de Brudzewo a-t-elle influencé Copernic ? Un nouveau regard sur les réflexions astronomiques au XVe siècle, Almagest, 41/1, 2013, pp. 1–47.
 Michela Malpangotto, The original motivation for Copernicus' research: Albert of Brudzewo's Commentariolum super Theoricas novas Georgii Purbachii, Archive for History of Exact Sciences, 70/4, 2016, pp. 361–411.
 Michela Malpangotto, Theoricae novae planetarum Georgii Peurbachii dans l'histoire de l'astronomie — Sources — Édition critique avec traduction française — Commentaire technique — Diffusion du XVe au XVIIe siècle, Paris, CNRS Éditions, 2020.

External links

Adler Planetarium
(https://web.archive.org/web/20070927222403/http://www.info.kalisz.pl/Biograf/Wojciechzb.htm) Biographical note on Wojciech of Brudzewo

1445 births
1497 deaths
Jagiellonian University alumni
Academic staff of Jagiellonian University
15th-century Polish astronomers
Medieval Polish mathematicians
Diplomats of the Polish–Lithuanian Commonwealth
Polish Renaissance humanists
Polish Roman Catholics
Scholars of ancient Greek philosophy
15th-century Polish writers
15th-century philosophers
15th-century Latin writers
15th-century Polish philosophers